Rajiv Dogra is an Indian diplomat, television commentator, writer and an artist. He was the Indian Ambassador to Italy and Romania and Consul General to Karachi, Pakistan. He was also India's Permanent Representative to the United Nations Agencies based in Rome.

References
 http://www.newindianexpress.com/lifestyle/books/2017/nov/18/the-chessboard-of-empires-1703126.html
 https://web.archive.org/web/20060510235027/http://www.forumrisparmio.it/english/bio2006/Dogra.htm
 
 http://www.dawn.com/2006/01/04/top17.htm
 https://www.amazon.co.uk/Almost-Ambassador-Rajiv-Dogra/dp/8188575577/ref=sr_1_1?ie=UTF8&s=books&qid=1226230071&sr=1-1
 http://www.millenniumpost.in/features/top-writers-honoured-at-rec-vow-awards-329410

1948 births
Living people
Ambassadors of India to Romania
Ambassadors of India to Italy
Ambassadors of India to San Marino
Indian expatriates in Pakistan